Casinos may refer to:
 Casinos, Valencia, municipality in Spain
 David Casinos (born 1972), Spanish Paralympian athlete
 The Casinos, an American popular music group

See also
Casino (disambiguation)